The Miami metropolitan area is the metropolitan area centered on Miami, Florida.

The Miami metropolitan area may also refer to:
The Miami, Oklahoma micropolitan area, United States

See also
Miami (disambiguation)